The Tour of Mersin was a cycling race held in Turkey it was last held in 2019. In 2019 it was part of UCI Europe Tour in category 2.2.

Winners

References

Cycle races in Turkey
2015 establishments in Turkey
Recurring sporting events established in 2015
UCI Europe Tour races
Spring (season) events in Turkey